Skokie School District 68 is a school district headquartered in Skokie, Illinois. It serves northwestern sections of Skokie and a portion of Morton Grove.

Schools
 Junior high school
 Old Orchard Junior High School

 Elementary schools
 Devonshire Elementary School
 Highland Elementary School
 Jane Stenson Elementary School

 Preschool
 Early Childhood Center

References

External links
 
 District Boundary

School districts in Cook County, Illinois
Skokie, Illinois